Leontovich may refer to:

 21397 Leontovich (1998 FJ54), a main-belt asteroid
 an alternative name for the Ukrainian composer Mykola Leontovych